The 1984 Austrian motorcycle Grand Prix was the fourth round of the 1984 Grand Prix motorcycle racing season. It took place on the weekend of 18–20 May 1984 at the Salzburgring.

Classification

500 cc

References

Austrian motorcycle Grand Prix
Austrian
Motorcycle Grand Prix
Austrian motorcycle Grand Prix